Bennett Environmental Inc. was a company based in Oakville, Ontario, Canada.  It specialized in the recovering of soils contaminated with chlorinated hydrocarbons, including PCBs and PCPs, Dioxins and Furans. The company was founded in 1991 and had 79 employees.  The company sold the soil treatment facility in 2013 and ceased operations as an environmental company.
The shell later transformed into Diversified Royalty Corp, specializing in franchise royalty agreements including Mr. Lube, Sutton Realty, and Franworks restaurants.

In 2016, John Bennett, the founder and former CEO of Bennett Environmental was convicted of conspiring to pay kickbacks and committing major fraud against the United States in attempts to win contaminated soil contracts. He was sentenced to 63 months in prison.

References

External links
 Official site
 Company's Profile

Companies listed on the NEX Exchange
Companies formerly listed on the Toronto Stock Exchange
Chemical companies of Canada
Companies based in Oakville, Ontario
Technology companies established in 1991
1991 establishments in Ontario
Technology companies disestablished in 2013
2013 disestablishments in Ontario